Robert Robotham (by 1522 – 1570/71), of London, Hartington, Derbyshire and Raskelf, Yorkshire, was an English politician.

He was a Member (MP) of the Parliament of England for Reigate in March 1553, for Dorchester in 1555 and for Reading in 1563.

References

1570s deaths
Politicians from London
People from Hartington, Derbyshire
Politicians from Yorkshire
Year of birth uncertain
English MPs 1553 (Edward VI)
English MPs 1555
English MPs 1563–1567
Members of the Parliament of England for Dorchester